Henry fitzGerold (sometimes Henry Fitz Gerald or Henry Fitzgerald; died c. 1174) was a 12th-century Anglo-Norman nobleman and government official.

Early life
FitzGerold was probably the son of Robert fitzGerald, an Essex landowner. Henry definitely had a brother named Warin. The brothers' first appearance in the documentary record was as witnesses to the foundation document of Walden Abbey, some time between 1138 and 1144. Henry subsequently witnessed a number of the future King Henry II's charters before the latter's accession to the throne of England. Soon after 1154, he was appointed constable of Wallingford Castle. Henry II sent him to Sens on a diplomatic mission to the pope in 1163.

Career
FitzGerold was the steward to Geoffrey de Mandeville, the Earl of Essex, from around 1154 as well as holding land worth 4 knight's fees from Mandeville. From 1158 to 1170 he was chamberlain to Henry II, succeeding his brother Warin. Besides the lands held of Mandeville, Henry and Warin acquired the majority of the lands of Eudo Dapifer; Henry's share amounted to more than 50 knight's fees in Essex in 1166. FitzGerold also had the farm of the royal manor of Sutton Courtenay in Berkshire, which was worth £50 per annum.  From 1166 until 1168 he was responsible for royal payments to knights in Kent. He also served as a royal justice in Kent during 1168–1169.

Death and legacy
FitzGerold married Matilda de Chesney, the heiress of William de Chesney, whose parentage remains unknown. They had two sons, Warin and Henry. The elder fitzGerold died in 1174–1175, and was survived by Matilda and his sons. He was buried at Reading Abbey. Besides grants to Reading, he had also given gifts to Southwark Priory and to the cathedral chapter of Rochester Cathedral.

FitzGerold's eldest son Warin inherited the majority of his father's estates. Warin married Alice de Courcy. Warin's daughter Margaret married Baldwin de Redvers and their son was Baldwin de Redvers, the 6th Earl of Devon. The younger Henry married Ermentrude Talbot and became prominent in the service of William Marshall, the first Earl of Pembroke.

Citations

References

 
  
 

Anglo-Normans
1170s deaths
Year of birth unknown
Burials at Reading Abbey